The Corn Production Act 1917 (7 & 8 Geo. V, c. 46) was an Act passed by the Parliament of the United Kingdom under David Lloyd George's coalition government during the Great War. The Act guaranteed British farmers a good price for their cereal crops so that Britain would not have to import them, as German U-boats were sinking ships importing food into Britain. When it was repealed by Stanley Baldwin's Conservative government, the effects in rural areas were similar to a sudden slump.

Notes

United Kingdom Acts of Parliament 1917
Agriculture legislation in the United Kingdom